William Johnstone VC (6 August 1823 – 20 August 1857) was a Royal Navy sailor and a recipient of the Victoria Cross, the highest award for gallantry in the face of the enemy that can be awarded to British and Commonwealth forces. He enlisted and served as John Johnstone.

He is listed as being born in Hanover  and served on four ships; the St. Vincent, a ship transporting people to Australia and Tasmania (1845-1849), HMS Reynard (1849-1852) which operated in the China Seas, fighting pirates and was shipwrecked near Pratas Island in the South China Sea on 31 May 1851. The whole crew survived the sinking when HMS Pilot rescued them. The Reynard could not be saved. He then transferred to HMS Arrogant and later, to HMS Brunswick.

Victoria Cross

He was 31 years old, and a stoker in the Royal Navy during the Crimean War when the following deed took place for which he was awarded the VC.

On 9 August 1854 in the Baltic, Leading Stoker Johnstone and a Lieutenant (John Bythesea) from HMS Arrogant, landed on the island of Vårdö, Åland off Finland in order to intercept important despatches from the tsar which were being sent via Vårdö to Bomarsund. The two men spent two nights reconnoitring the island, being helped by a local farmer and his daughter to evade capture by the Russians and on 12 August when the despatches arrived, they ambushed the five Russians carrying them. Two of the carriers dropped their mail bags and ran, but the other three surrendered and were taken to the Arrogant. In this action the Officer and Leading Stoker were armed with just one pistol and a knife. Upon their return, the Commanders of both the English and French ships in the fleet were delighted, with the French being involved in suggesting they both be awarded the Victoria Cross. His RN records in the UK National Archives show he was a Leading Stoker until May 24th, 1856 when he was demoted to Ship's Cook until his demise. The reason for the demotion is not given, but given his good character throughout his career at sea, it is assumed by his descendants that there was cause to place him in such a lowly position on board.

Death
He died on 20 August 1857 from self-inflicted wounds while serving aboard  in the West Indies. He cut his own throat after attacking another man with a knife and felt the remorse of his actions, taking his own life by the same knife. He was then buried at sea in the St Vincent Passage, West Indies.

William Johnstone's medal was sold after his death and became part of a collection which on the death of the new owner, was gifted to and displayed in the Natural History Museum of Los Angeles County.

Upon his death, his wife, Caroline, was "looked after by the Patriotic Fund," which was set up to cater for the needs of War Widows. He left a wife and a young son, Richard John. The family lived in St. Germans, Cornwall. UK. 

A pencil sketch exists in the Imperial War Museum's catalogues pertaining to information on Victoria Cross winners.

Notes

1823 births
1857 deaths
Crimean War recipients of the Victoria Cross
Royal Navy personnel of the Crimean War
Royal Navy sailors
Burials at sea
Royal Navy recipients of the Victoria Cross
Suicides by sharp instrument